Johan Mikael Wallberg (born 18 March 1977 in Karlsborg, Sweden) is a former freestyle swimmer from Sweden. He competed twice at the Summer Olympics for his native country, in 1996 and 2000, both in the Men's 4 × 100 m freestyle relay. After his active career he became coach for Swedish swimmer Therese Alshammar. During the autumn of 2016, he became coach for Sarah Sjöström.

Clubs
SK Neptun
Täby Sim

References
 

1977 births
Living people
People from Karlsborg Municipality
Swedish male freestyle swimmers
Swimmers at the 1996 Summer Olympics
Swimmers at the 2000 Summer Olympics
Olympic swimmers of Sweden
Swedish swimming coaches
SK Neptun swimmers
Täby Sim swimmers
Sportspeople from Västra Götaland County